This article discusses crime in the U.S. state of Wyoming.

Statistics
In 2008 there were 15,823 crimes reported in Wyoming, including 12 murders. In 2014 there were 12,619 crimes reported, including 16 murders.

In 2016  there were  12,890 crimes reported, including 20 murders, violent crime1,430

Capital punishment laws

Capital punishment is applied in this state, although no one has been executed since 1992.

Feb 15, 2019 Wyoming Senate rejects bill to repeal death penalty.''

References 
Wyoming Crime Statistics